Margaret Elizabeth Sheridan (October 29, 1926 – May 1, 1982) was an American actress of the early 1950s, and protégée of director Howard Hawks. She is best remembered for her role as Nikki Nicholson opposite Kenneth Tobey in the 1951 science fiction classic The Thing from Another World.

Career
She was born in Los Angeles, California, to Thomas Galligan Sheridan, Sr., and Julia P. Sheridan.  Sheridan was discovered by Howard Hawks while she was still attending college. Initially, Hawks believed she was the most promising actress of her era.

In 1947, she married William F. Pattison, a professional airline pilot. Hawks offered Sheridan the female lead opposite John Wayne in the 1948 film Red River. Sheridan turned down the role because she was expecting the birth of her first child. Joanne Dru accepted the role.

Hawks offered her the role of Nikki Nicholson in the 1951 film The Thing from Another World, where the quality of the film and her performance cemented her in the minds of film lovers. Sheridan's career suffered, and she never achieved the fame Hawks had hoped. Motherhood and a few years of maturity had evidently changed her. Hawks is quoted as saying she was just "not the same girl" he had discovered. He later commented that if she had taken the role in Red River, her career would have flourished.

She died at age 55 of lung cancer on May 1, 1982, in Orange, California.

Filmography

References

External links

The Private Life and Times of Margaret Sheridan

1926 births
1982 deaths
American film actresses
Deaths from lung cancer in California
Actresses from Los Angeles
20th-century American actresses